The contemplation of the nine stages of a decaying corpse is a Buddhist meditational practice in which the practitioner imagines or observes the gradual decomposition of a dead body. In Japan, images of the stages are called  and became related to aesthetic ideas of impermanence.

The oldest instances of the nine stages of decay are in the "Sutra on the  Contemplation of the Oceanlike Buddha," and the "Discourse on the Great Wisdom" by Nagarjuna ( 150–250 AD).

The setting for the nine stages is outdoors, where a corpse would be left exposed to decay in a field or graveyard. The exact stages included vary between sources. The  refers to the stages as the nine    and lists them as follows:
 distension
 rupture
 exudation of blood
 putrefaction
 discolouration and desiccation
 consumption by animals and birds
 dismemberment
 reduction to bones
 parching to dust

History
Different purposes have been assigned to the contemplation of the nine stages of a decaying corpse, and the details of the practice transformed over time.

Various techniques of meditation on the process of bodily decay date back to early Buddhism, originating in India. Early lists of nine stages of decay can be found in the "Sutra on the  Contemplation of the Oceanlike Buddha," and the "Discourse on the Great Wisdom"

Buddhist tales suggest that monks used the contemplation of a decaying corpse as a monastic practice to reduce sensual desire. In one Japanese tale, a monk called Genpin who has fallen in love with a chief councillor’s wife overcomes this desire by imagining the woman's body decaying, and thus attains enlightenment by understanding the nature of the body. In as much as the practice served to the reduce sexual desire of a male practitioner, the corpse in question tended to be female. However, the nine stages were also used to reduce one's attachment to one's own body, and women themselves were encouraged to participate in the contemplation of their bodily impurity. Some Theravāda sources such as the  also contradict this by stressing that one must seek a corpse of one's own sex to contemplate, as doing otherwise would be unchaste.

In some texts, the contemplation of different phases is recommended for the elimination of different aspects of lust for the body. For example, the  recommends phases 8 and 9 to eliminate the "lust for touch," but phases 3, 4, and 5 for the "lust for colours."

Buddhist tales also suggest that real corpses were observed as part of the practice, rather than relying on pure imagination. This was possible at a time when corpses were left exposed in graveyards and fields. With training, the image could be retained and summoned at will, as in the tale of Genpin above.

Pictorial representations

There is literary evidence of pictorial representations of the nine stages of decay from China during the Tang dynasty, including Baoji's poem Contemplation on the Mural of the Nine Stages of a Decaying Corpse ( 618-907 AD). Japanese images of the nine stages, called , date from the 13th century. There are a large number of  still being used in religion in Japan, and Japanese artists such as Fuyuko Matsui have continued the theme of the nine stages into the 21st century.

 vary in the presentation of their subjects. Some  such as the  present the decay of the female corpse in the context of the nature, "amidst a world of seasonal trees, flowers, and other flora." Others, including one very early example in the  collection, depict the stages against a blank background with high precision, "diagrammatic in [their] presentation."

 were probably shown to laypeople for the purpose of teaching the doctrine of impermanence in e-toki sessions, and displayed during the Obon festival.

Paintings of Ono no Komachi
These depictions of Komachi are related to a tradition of literature that emphasises the contrast between her physical beauty during her youth, and her ageing and poverty at the end of her life.

In contemporary art
The  of Kinbaku painter Seiu Ito (1882–1961) have been linked to the modern erotic grotesque style. Fuyuko Matsui's recent "New Kusozu" series was inspired by the traditional painting genre, but also founded honestly on the reality of being a human being and a woman in the world today, intending to transcend a mere adaptation of a classical theme and truly realise a contemporary Kusouzu sequence.

In poetry
The nine stages of decay have featured as the subject of several Chinese and Japanese poems. In Japan there are two main poems, attributed to Kūkai (774 – 835), founder of Shingon Buddhism, and Su Tongpo (1037 – 1101), a Song dynasty politician.

The Su Tongpo poem links the impermanence of the human form to changing natural and seasonal imagery. For example, the second verse, distension, describes the deceased's hair becoming entangled with grass roots:

Misogyny
During the edo period, such doctrines of the spiritual inferiority of women where used to indoctrinate the three obediances into women and girls. This analysis has been criticised with reference to  teachings that posit that women have Buddha nature precisely because of their impurity. The tales of Empress Danrin and Empress Kōmyō provide examples of women who willingly planned to expose their decaying bodies to the public as an act of Buddhist devotion, in the hope that "sentient beings in the Latter Days of the Buddhist Law should be awakened through exposure to the impure human condition."

Paintings from The death of a noble lady and the decay of her body
The death of a noble lady and the decay of her body is a series of  paintings in watercolor, produced in Japan around the 18th century. The subject of the paintings is thought to be Ono no Komachi.

There are nine paintings, including a pre-death  portrait, and a final painting of a memorial structure:

See also
 Sky burial – Tibetan burial practice in which the corpse is exposed to the elements

References

Buddhist art
Buddhist poetry
Death
Stage theories
Buddhist meditation